In predicate logic, existential instantiation (also called existential elimination) is a rule of inference which says that, given a formula of the form , one may infer  for a new constant symbol c. The rule has the restrictions that the constant c introduced by the rule must be a new term that has not occurred earlier in the proof, and it also must not occur in the conclusion of the proof. This is implied by the notation , but its explicit statement is often left out of explanations.

In one formal notation, the rule may be denoted by

where a is a new constant symbol that has not appeared in the proof.

See also 
 Existential fallacy
 Universal instantiation
 List of rules of inference

References 

Rules of inference
Predicate logic